Xplorer may refer to:

 New South Wales Xplorer, a passenger train in Australia introduced in 1993
 Ohio Xplorer, a New York Central Railroad passenger train in Ohio introduced in 1956
 xplorer², a Windows file manager 
 Xplorer Motorhomes, a builder of recreational vehicles
 Xplorer UltraFlight an aircraft manufacturer based in Cape Town, South Africa